On the Way to School is a 2008 Turkish documentary film directed by Orhan Eskiköy and Özgür Doğan. It has attracted 78,000 people in eight weeks, an impressive showing for a documentary.

The film is an openhearted account of a young Turkish teacher during a school year in a Kurdish village in southeastern Turkey.

Production
Film production began in September 2007 and was completed in June 2008.

Release

General release 

Reception

Box office
The film debuted number five in the Turkish box office chart and has made a total gross of $399,581.

Awards
 3rd International Middle East Film Festival (9-17 Oct, 2009) - Black Pearl Award for best Middle Eastern documentary film (Won)
 46th Antalya Golden Orange Film Festival (10-17 Oct, 2009) - Golden Orange for Best First Film: Özgür Dogan & Orhan Eskikoy (Won)
 21st Ankara International Film Festival (11–21 March 2010) - Mahmut Tali Öngören Special Award (Won)

Locations
The film was photographed mostly in Demirci village which is in Şanlıurfa, Turkey.

See also 
 2008 in film
 Turkish films of 2008

References

External links
 
 

2008 films
Turkish documentary films
2008 documentary films
Kurdish-language films
Documentary films about education
Education in Turkey